The Dark Red is a 2018 American independent mystery thriller film edited, produced, written and directed by Dan Bush and co-written by and starring Conal Byrne. The film premiered at the 2018 Austin Film Festival.

Plot
A worker from child protective services finds a baby alive in the trailer home of its dead and intoxicated mother. Fast forward, Sybil Warren is a warden in a psychiatric hospital. Every day she meets with her therapist, Dr. Deluce, to whom she describes the living hell that her life has been. On one of such days, Sybil tells her that she is possessed by a demon who gifted her psychic powers, but who in return for it, kidnapped her and cut her unborn baby out of her uterus. As a psychiatrist, Dr. Deluce tries to come up with a rational explanation for the tale that Sybil told her. One of such explanations that Dr. Deluce proposed was that her ex-boyfriend, David, following her being pregnant, invites her to meet his parents. A discussion over a dinner table about their grandchild-to-be provokes an argument, which Sybil barely escapes. Despite being diagnosed as schizophrenic, Sybil is being released from the hospital, and following it, tracks down her ex-boyfriend and seeks revenge.

Cast
April Billingsley as Sybil Warren
Celementine June Seng Stack as young Sybil Warren
Kelsey Scott as Dr. Deluce
Conal Byrne as David Hollyfield
Rhoda Griffis as Rose Holyfield
John Curran as William Holyfield
Jill Jane Clements as Kathrine Warren
Bernard Setaro Clark as Dr. Morales
Robert Pralgo as CEO
Robert Mello as grieving man
Kevin Stillwell as Mr. Mercer
Blaire Hillman as woman in the purple coat
Katie Hahn as pregnant woman
Sorrell Sanders as suicide woman
Lake Roberts as corporate lawyer #1
Lauren Vogelbaum as corporate lawyer #2

Reception
On review aggregator website Rotten Tomatoes, the film has an approval rating of 78% based on 9 critics, with an average rating of 6.5/10.

Richard Whittaker of The Austin Chronicle wrote "The Dark Red isn't afraid to get a little bloody, and it's all the more entertaining for it".

Noel Murray of the Los Angeles Times said that the film "feels out of balance", adding that "[while] the blood-soaked climactic standoff is fine, [it is] not exciting or scary enough to justify an hour of slow-paced setup".

Writing for Variety, Dennis Harvey commented "A psychiatric patient's convoluted backstory drives this intriguing if overloaded indie genre exercise".

References

External links

2020s mystery thriller films
American mystery thriller films
2010s English-language films
2020s English-language films
2010s American films